Eremaea is a genus of moths belonging to the family Lasiocampidae.

The species of this genus are found in Australia.

Species:

Eremaea coralliphora 
Eremaea zonospila

References

Lasiocampidae
Moth genera